The 2016 Ladbrokes World Grand Prix was a professional ranking snooker tournament that took place between 8 and 13 March 2016 at the Venue Cymru in Llandudno, Wales. It was the seventh ranking event of the 2015/2016 season.

The defending champion Judd Trump lost 2–4 against Stuart Bingham in the last 16. Shaun Murphy beat Stuart Bingham 10–9 in the final to win the £100,000 first prize. The tournament was broadcast in the UK on ITV4.

Prize fund
The breakdown of prize money for this year is shown below:

Winner: £100,000
Runner-up: £35,000
Semi-final: £20,000
Quarter-final: £10,000
Last 16: £5,000
Last 32: £2,500

Highest break: £5,000
Total: £300,000

The "rolling 147 prize" for a maximum break was won at the previous ranking event, the Welsh Open, and so stood at £5,000. The sponsor pledged to double the prize for a 147 break and so the prize was £10,000.

Seeding list
The top 32 players on a one-year ranking system running from the 2015 Australian Goldfields Open until the 2016 Gdynia Open qualified for the tournament.

Source:

Main draw

Final

Century breaks
Total: 15

133, 125  Joe Perry
122  Judd Trump
120, 110  Shaun Murphy
119  Michael Holt
114  Marco Fu
112  Tom Ford

110  Martin Gould
108  Ding Junhui
107  John Higgins
105  Liang Wenbo
104, 103  Ryan Day
103  Ali Carter

References

World Grand Prix (snooker)
World Grand Prix
World Grand Prix
Snooker competitions in Wales
Llandudno
World Grand Prix